İbrahim Sürgülü (born 4 April 1993) is a Turkish footballer who plays as a centre-back for Şanlıurfaspor. He made his Süper Lig debut on 4 November 2013.

References

External links
 
 
 

1993 births
People from Polatlı
Living people
Turkish footballers
Association football defenders
Sivasspor footballers
Fethiyespor footballers
Bursaspor footballers
1922 Konyaspor footballers
MKE Kırıkkalespor footballers
Kırklarelispor footballers
Ankara Demirspor footballers
İnegölspor footballers
Şanlıurfaspor footballers
Süper Lig players
TFF First League players
TFF Second League players
TFF Third League players